In enzymology, a N-methylhydantoinase (ATP-hydrolysing) is an enzyme that catalyzes the chemical reaction

ATP + N-methylimidazolidine-2,4-dione + 2 H2O  ADP + phosphate + N-carbamoylsarcosine

The 3 substrates of this enzyme are ATP, N-methylimidazolidine-2,4-dione, and H2O, whereas its 3 products are ADP, phosphate, and N-carbamoylsarcosine.

This enzyme belongs to the family of hydrolases, those acting on carbon-nitrogen bonds other than peptide bonds, specifically in cyclic amides.  The systematic name of this enzyme class is N-methylimidazolidine-2,4-dione amidohydrolase (ATP-hydrolysing). Other names in common use include N-methylhydantoin amidohydrolase, methylhydantoin amidase, N-methylhydantoin hydrolase, and N-methylhydantoinase.  This enzyme participates in arginine, creatinine, and proline metabolism.

References

 

EC 3.5.2
Enzymes of unknown structure